Natrinema hispanicum is a species of archaea in the family Natrialbaceae.

References 

Halobacteria
Archaea described in 2007